Salix candida, also known as sageleaf willow, is a shrub in the Salicaceae family found in northern United States and Canada. It is 0.5 to 3.5 m tall.

References

External links
Salix candida

candida